Eduardo Bueso was the acting mayor of San Pedro Sula from June 28, 2009 until January 27, 2010. He is a member of the Liberal Party of Honduras.

References 

Living people
Mayors of places in Honduras
Liberal Party of Honduras politicians
Year of birth missing (living people)